Babka Tower is a skyscraper in Warsaw, Poland, completed around 2001. It was the first residential building in Poland whose height is over 100m.

References

Skyscrapers in Warsaw
Residential skyscrapers in Poland

Buildings and structures completed in 2001